IEEE Security & Privacy is a peer-reviewed scientific journal published by  jointly by the IEEE Computer Society and the IEEE Reliability Society. It covers  security, privacy, and dependability of computer-based systems. The publication includes studies, surveys, tutorials, columns, and in-depth interviews of interest to the information security industry.

The editor in chief is  Sean Peisert; the preceding editor was David M. Nicol.

It is indexed in Scopus and in Science Citation Index Expanded; the 2020 impact factor is  3.573.

References

External links

IEEE academic journals
Computer science journals
English-language journals